Lonicera arizonica, the Arizona honeysuckle, is a deciduous honeysuckle in the family Caprifoliaceae, native to the Southwest United States and Northern Mexico.

It was first described by Alfred Rehder.

References 

arizonica
Flora of Mexico
Flora of North America
Taxa named by Alfred Rehder